Chandler & Price was founded in 1881 in Cleveland, Ohio, by Harrison T. Chandler and William H. Price. They manufactured machinery for printers including a series of hand-fed platen jobbing presses, as well as an automatic feeder for these presses (the Rice Feeder), paper cutters, book presses, and assorted equipment. Despite dominating the industry in the 1930s, by the 1950s the offset printing industry had eclipsed the world of movable type printing, and only Chandler & Price and Brandtjen and Kluge continued to make open platen (Gordon) presses. Chandler & Price ceased production of presses in 1964.

There are three main generations of the Chandler & Price press, all distinguished by the style of the flywheel: Old Style (pre-1910; wavy spokes), New Style (after 1910; plain spokes), or Craftsman (after 1921; solid flywheel). The New Style made by Chandler & Price was such a popular press that The Practice Of Printing: Letterpress and Offset by Ralph Polk, the standard textbook for thousands of high school printing programs in the middle of the 20th century, used the press as its example when teaching students the basics of press operation.

External links

 C&P—Pressman's Favorite from the Amalgamated Printers' Association
 New style serial numbers and dates built
 Complete serial numbers list by year of manufacture for both old and new style as well as Craftsman

Printing press manufacturers
Manufacturing companies based in Cleveland
Defunct companies based in Cleveland
Manufacturing companies established in 1881
Manufacturing companies disestablished in 1964
1881 establishments in Ohio
1960s disestablishments in Ohio